Dionizije Dvornić (27 April 1926 – 30 October 1992) was a Croatian football striker who achieved greatest success playing for Dinamo Zagreb in Yugoslav First League in the 1950s.

During his time with Dinamo, he won one Yugoslav Cup in 1951 and a Yugoslav First League title in 1954. He made a total of 304 appearances and scored 161 goals for Dinamo, 47 of which were in league games.

Club career
Before joining Dinamo, he played for NK Udarnik (which was renamed NK Proleter in 1947 and later merged with today's NK Osijek) and FK Dinamo Pančevo. After leaving Dinamo he spent four years at NK Zagreb before going abroad and ending his career in Switzerland.

International career
Dvornić made his debut for Yugoslavia in a friendly game against France on 18 October 1953 in Zagreb, and went on to earn 6 caps, scoring one goal for the national squad. He also competed for Yugoslavia at the 1954 FIFA World Cup, when Yugoslavia made it to the quarterfinals only to be knocked out by Germany. His final international was a September 1954 friendly match against Saarland.

Honours
Yugoslav First League
Winner (1): 1953–54
Runner-up (1): 1951
Yugoslav Cup
Winner (1): 1951
Runner-up (1): 1950

References

External links
 

1926 births
1992 deaths
People from Popovac
Association football forwards
Yugoslav footballers
Yugoslavia international footballers
1954 FIFA World Cup players
NK Osijek players
GNK Dinamo Zagreb players
NK Zagreb players
FC Lausanne-Sport players
FC Vevey United players
Yugoslav First League players
Swiss Super League players
Swiss Challenge League players
Yugoslav expatriate footballers
Expatriate footballers in Switzerland
Yugoslav expatriate sportspeople in Switzerland